Zoran G. Jančić (born in Sarajevo, Bosnia-Herzegovina, Yugoslavia) is a Bosnian Serb pianist.

He was educated at Primary and Secondary Music School. He gave his first recital at the age of twelve. He was also educated at the Zagreb Academy of Music (Croatia) and graduated with First Class Honours in Music Performances. He subsequently completed his Postgraduate Studies (MA) at the end of 1983. Jancic’s music and teaching have a living pulse directly linked with former pupils of Franz Liszt through his piano teacher Pavica Gvozdić, whose predecessor Svetislav Stančić studied with Liszt’s pupils Y. Barth and Conrad Ansorge in Berlin. Jancic also took part in master classes conducted by Evgeny Timakin, Rudolf Kerrer, Arbo Valdma, Leonid Brunberg and Pierre Barbisett, prominent figures within 20th century’s Russian and French school of thought 1979-1982.

Jancic became Professor of Piano Studies at the Academy of Music in Sarajevo (Bosnia and Herzegovina) and was one of the last staff to continue teaching despite of the war. He continued to give performances during the siege of Sarajevo until he left the city in the spring 1993. "It was experience of a lifetime to teach and perform in such life threatening conditions," he said. Jancic’s competitions successes include winning First Prize in the 13th Competitions for Young Musicians of Yugoslavia 1979, than the First Prize in The Greatest Musical Talent Competition. His many awards include Outstanding European Musician and the Croatian Institute of Music Awards for the Best Interpretation of Beethoven (Sonata op. 110 in A flat major). He was also finalist at the International Pianists Competition in Udine – Italy. Jancic was frequently invited to participate in major music festivals within his native homeland including Ohrid and Dubrovnik International Music Festivals.

His engagements included numerous performances as a soloist with the leading orchestras there. He was the first among his peers to perform complete cycles of works by Frédéric Chopin (4 Ballades, 24 Etudes op. 10 and op. 25, the Waltzes, 21 Nocturnes, 4 Rondos) and Isaac Albéniz's (Suite española). The audiences of the former Yugoslavia were also treated to the first performance ever of the complete cycle by Enrique Granados – Goyescas. His other engagements also included solo recitals and tours in Germany, Italy, France, Ireland, United Kingdom and Denmark. 

Critics have cited his rich, warm tones, his magnificent dynamism and his exquisite sensitivity to the nuances of the music he performs. His affinity with the music of Ravel, Debussy and Franck has merited commendations from the acclaimed Marcelle de la Cour, Director of the Conservatoire Superiere de Musique in Paris. He is currently teaching at Faculty of Arts in the city of Niš, Serbia, and he is also head of piano department.

References

External links
Official website

Living people
Musicians from Sarajevo
Serbian classical pianists
21st-century classical pianists
Year of birth missing (living people)